Originally called the nunnery of Lekeley from the name of the land it was built upon, the former nunnery of Seaton is to the north of the parish of Bootle, Cumbria, England.

Early life
The nunnery was founded at Lekeley by Henry son of Arthur son of Godard, lord of Millom, in the late twelfth century. It was dedicated to the Blessed Virgin and its nuns followed the Benedictine Rule. The nunnery was never prosperous, in common with other religious associations of women in the region, due to the unsettled nature of the area caused by the proximity to the Scottish border. 
I

In 1227, Archbishop Walter Gray granted the appropriation of the church of St. Michael of Irton to the prioress and convent of Lekeley to alleviate their poverty.  Later, in 1357, Henry, Duke of Lancaster,  granted the appropriation of the hospital of St. Leonard, Lancaster, to assist the house. The abbey of Holmcultram also helped the nuns. In 1459, Thomas York, abbot of Holmcultram, leased all the lands the abbey possessed between Esk and Duddon called Lekeley, to Elizabeth Croft, prioress, for 12 years at an annual rent of twenty shillings.

Sculptural remains
There are remains of the conventical church, with lancet-shaped windows. 
A fragment appears to have been the monumental slab of a prioress built into the wall of a barn at High Hyton not far from the nunnery. Part of the church has been lost, but the remaining inscription reads: + HIC IACET . . . DENTONA AN . . . From the charges made in 1536 by Layton and Legh, Joan Copland was the prioress at that date and that Susanna Rybton was an inmate of the house

Dissolution
The total revenue of the nunnery in 1535 was returned at £13 17s. 4d. The date of dissolution is not known, but by 1537, Sir Hugo Askew had the lease of the Priory lands. An attempt was made, when the northern counties rose in rebellion, to oust him and restore the nuns to their old home.

Known Prioresses of Seton
Elizabeth Croft,  occurs 1459

Joan Seaton,  occurs 1535

Joan Copland,  occurs 1536

References

J. Wilson (editor) Victoria County History - A History of the County of Cumberland: Volume 2, pub 1905

Monasteries in Cumbria
Benedictine nunneries in England
12th-century establishments in England
1542 disestablishments in England
Christian monasteries established in the 12th century
Bootle, Cumbria